Sheykhha (also Romanized as Sheykhhā) is a village in Dorungar Rural District, Now Khandan District, Dargaz County, Razavi Khorasan Province, Iran. At the 2006 census, its population was 170, in 48 families.

References 

Populated places in Dargaz County